Chaetonotus (Chaetonotus) is a gastrotrich subgenus in the family Chaetonotidae.

References

External links

 
Animal subgenera